Léandri or Leandri is a surname. Notable people with the surname include:

 Étienne Léandri (1915–1995), intermediary close to Charles Pasqua
 Jacques Désiré Leandri (1903–1982), French botanist and mycologist
Sylvain Léandri (born 1948), French footballer

See also
 Leandro (given name)